This is a list of institutions related to the culture of Sweden.

Swedish 20th-century culture is noted by pioneering works by the early days of cinema, with Mauritz Stiller and Victor Sjöström. Later, moguls like Ingmar Bergman and actresses such as Greta Garbo, Ingrid Bergman and Anita Ekberg made careers abroad. Swedish music is in many minds connected with ABBA, although more recently indie bands like The Soundtrack of Our Lives, The Hives, Sahara Hotnights and The (International) Noise Conspiracy have started achieving international fame. The Swedish hip hop scene is booming. Swedish literature is also vibrant and active, and Sweden ranks third in the list of countries with the most Nobel Prize laureates in literature.

Language-related institutions 
Strindberg Museum
Swedish Academy
Swedish Language Council

Art and design instutitons 
Hallwyl Museum
Millesgården
Moderna Museet
Nationalmuseum
Nordic Watercolour Museum
Prince Eugen's Waldemarsudde
Röhsska Museum
Rooseum
Royal Swedish Academy of Arts
Swedish Centre for Architecture and Design
Swedish National Art Council
Thiel Gallery
Zorn Collections

Music institutions 
Gothenburg Symphony Orchestra
Royal Swedish Academy of Music
Swedish National Collections of Music
Swedish National Concert Institute

Theatre and dance institutions 
Dansens hus (House of Dance)
Dansmuseet
Drottningholm Palace Theatre
The Göteborg Opera
Malmö Opera and Music Theatre
NorrlandsOperan
Royal Dramatic Theatre
Royal Swedish Opera
Swedish National Touring Theatre
Stockholm City Theatre

Heritage institutions 
Crown palaces in Sweden
Livrustkammaren
Maritime museums in Sweden
Marinmuseum
Maritiman
Maritime Museum (Stockholm)
Oskarshamn Maritime Museum
Vasa Museum
Nordic Museum
Skansen
Skokloster Castle
Swedish Army Museum
Swedish History Museum
Swedish Museum of Natural History
Swedish National Heritage Board
Swedish National Museum of Science and Technology
Museum of Work
Museum of World Culture

Media 
List of Swedish newspapers
List of Swedish radio channels
List of Swedish television channels
Sveriges Radio (Swedish Radio Ltd)
Sveriges Television
Sveriges Utbildningsradio (Swedish Educational Broadcasting Company)
Swedish Film Institute
Swedish National Board of Film Classification

Archiving institutions 
Royal Swedish Academy of Letters, History and Antiquities
Swedish Biographical Dictionary
Swedish Institute for Dialectology, Onomastics and Folklore Research
Swedish National Archives
Swedish Regional Archives

Swedish culture
Cultural institutions